The Netravati Express (16345/46) is a daily Express train connecting capital cities of Kerala and Maharashtra. The train runs on the Konkan Railway.

History
Initially the train the Bombay Kurla (LTT)–Mangalore/Cochin Netravati (Cochin–Kurla) Express was plied between Bombay to Mangalore/Kochi as link via the inland Poona, Gulbarga, Guntakal, Renigunta, Krishnarajapuram, Palakkad route parting at Shornur Junction. Trains on the old route used to take 48 hours to reach Mangalore from Bombay. After the Konkan Railway line was operational in 1998, the route has been changed via the Konkan Railway and the Mangalore–Bombay running time was reduced drastically to 16 hours. On March 1, 1998, the Bombay Kurla (LTT)–Mangalore/Cochin Netravati (Cochin–Kurla) Express started running via the Konkan, making it the first scheduled service that ran the length of the Konkan Railway. The link express was made a single train till Kochi and further extended till Thiruvananthapuram (which is the capital city of Kerala) from 10 February 2001.

Background
Mangalore city is situated at the banks of the Netravati River. Since this trains terminating point was Mangalore back then, the name of the train was set as Netravati Express.

Traction
As the route is completely electrified a Royapuram or an Erode-based WAP-7 hauls the train through out its entire journey.

Routing
The 16345/46 Netravati Express runs from Lokmanya Tilak Terminus, Roha (Technical Halt) crew Change,d, 
,,  Thiruvananthapuram Central.

Coach composition

The train was upgraded to modern LHB rake on September 26, 2019, with an MPS of 130 kmph. The train consists of 24 coaches:
 2 AC II Tier coach
 6 AC III Tier coaches
 1 AC III Tier Economy coaches
 8 Sleeper coaches
 1 Pantry car
 2 General coaches
 2 Generator cars

No rake sharing. Four dedicated LHB rakes.

See also
Ernakulam–Okha Express

References

External links
 Konkan Railway
 Netravati Express train route
  Times of India
  The Hindu
  Revised Coach Position

Transport in Mumbai
Transport in Thiruvananthapuram
Named passenger trains of India
Rail transport in Karnataka
Rail transport in Maharashtra
Railway services introduced in 1998
1998 establishments in India
Rail transport in Kerala
Rail transport in Goa
Express trains in India